The Fort Resolution Highway, officially Northwest Territories Highway 6, is a highway which following the shore of Great Slave Lake from the Buffalo River Junction (Highway 5) to Fort Resolution in Canada's Northwest Territories.

The town was one of the largest in the N.W.T., such that residents had very little reason to drive to Hay River, so complete were the services and products available. The mine closed in 1987, and in 1988 the town was closed, dismantled and abandoned. Only a network of urban streets remains.

References

Northwest Territories territorial highways